Geoffrey Hewlett Thompson (called Hewlett; born 14 August 1929) is a retired Anglican bishop. He is a former Bishop of Exeter in the Church of England.

Thompson was educated at Aldenham School and Trinity Hall, Cambridge. After National Service in the Queen's Own Royal West Kent Regiment, he studied for ordination at Cuddesdon College. He was made a deacon on Trinity Sunday 1954 (13 June) and ordained a priest the next Trinity Sunday (5 June 1955) — both times by Spencer Leeson, Bishop of Peterborough, at Peterborough Cathedral. He began his ordained ministry with a curacy at St Matthew's Northampton after which he was first vicar of St Augustine, Wisbech and subsequently of St Saviour's Folkestone. He was consecrated to the episcopate by Michael Ramsey, Archbishop of Canterbury, at Westminster Abbey on 24 January 1974. At first simply suffragan Bishop of Willesden in 1974, he became area bishop upon the foundation of the London area scheme in 1979 and six years later he was translated to diocesan Bishop of Exeter. In retirement he continues to serve the church as an honorary assistant bishop within the Diocese of Carlisle.

References

1929 births
People educated at Aldenham School
Alumni of Trinity Hall, Cambridge
Alumni of Ripon College Cuddesdon
Bishops of Willesden
Bishops of Exeter
20th-century Church of England bishops
Living people